A kamal, often called simply khashaba (wood in Arabic), is a celestial navigation device that determines latitude.  The invention of the kamal allowed for the earliest known latitude sailing, and was thus the earliest step towards the use of quantitative methods in navigation. It originated with Arab navigators of the late 9th century, and was employed in the Indian Ocean from the 10th century. It was adopted by Indian navigators soon after, and then adopted by Chinese navigators some time before the 16th century.

Description
 Since the Polaris is currently close to the celestial pole, its elevation is equal to the latitude of the observer. The kamal is used by placing one end of the string in the teeth while the other end is held away from the body roughly parallel to the ground. The card is then moved along the string, positioned so the lower edge is even with the horizon, and the upper edge is occluding a target star, typically Polaris because its angle to the horizon does not change with longitude or time. The angle can then be measured by counting the number of knots from the teeth to the card, or a particular knot can be tied into the string if travelling to a known latitude.

The knots were typically tied to measure angles of one finger-width. When held at arm's length, the width of a finger measures an angle that remains fairly similar from person to person. This was widely used (and still is today) for rough angle measurements, an angle known as issabah إصبع in Arabic or a zhi 指 in Chinese (both meaning 'finger'). By modern measure, this is about 1 degree, 36 minutes, and 25 seconds, or just over 1.5 degrees. It is equal to the arcsine of the ratio of the width of the finger to the length of the arm. In Chinese navigation, the unit of jiao 角 is also used to represent a quarter 指 (an angle of 24 minutes 6 seconds).

Due to the limited width of the card, the kamal was only really useful for measuring Polaris in equatorial latitudes, where Polaris remains close to the horizon. This fact may explain why it was not common in Europe. For these higher-latitude needs somewhat more complex devices based on the same principle were used, notably the cross-staff and backstaff.

The kamal is still a tool recommended for use in sea kayaking. In such an application, it can be used for estimating distances to land. The distance can be calculated from the formula

See also
Sextant

Notes

References
 Carreiro, Carlos B., Portugal's Golden Years, The Life and Times of Prince Henry "The Navigator". Dorrance Publishing Co., p. 84
 Malhão Pereira, J.M. (2003), "The Stellar Compass and the Kamal. An Interpretation of its Practical Use", in Proceedings of the International Seminar on Marine Archeology, Delhi, also published by Academia de Marinha (Lisbon, 2003).

Navigational equipment
Celestial navigation
Orientation (geometry)
Measuring instruments
Arab inventions